Culladia is a grass moth genus (family Crambidae) of subfamily Crambinae, tribe Crambini. Some authors have assigned the synonymous taxon Nirmaladia to the snout moth family (Pyralidae), where all grass moths were once also included, but this seems to be in error.

Description
Palpi porrect (extending forward), thickly scaled and extending about twice the length of head. Maxillary palpi triangularly scaled. Frons rounded. Antennae of male somewhat thickened and flattened. Spurs long and equal. Forewings long and narrow. Vein 3 from angle of cell and vein 6 from below upper angle. Vein 7 absent, and veins 8 and 9 stalked. Vein 10 and 11 free. Hindwings with vein 3 from near angle of cell. veins 6 and 7 from upper angle and vein 7 anastomosing (fusing) with vein 8.

Species
Culladia achroellum (Mabille, 1900)
Culladia admigratella (Walker, 1863)
Culladia assamella Błeszyński, 1970
Culladia cuneiferellus (Walker, 1863)
Culladia dentilinealis Hampson, 1919
Culladia elgonella Błeszyński, 1970
Culladia evae Błeszyński, 1970
Culladia hanna Błeszyński, 1970
Culladia hastiferalis (Walker, 1866)
Culladia inconspicuellus (Snellen, 1872)
Culladia miria Błeszyński, 1970
Culladia paralyticus (Meyrick, 1932)
Culladia serranella Błeszyński, 1970
Culladia strophaea (Meyrick, 1905)
Culladia suffusella Hampson, 1896
Culladia tonkinella Błeszyński, 1970
Culladia troglodytellus (Snellen, 1872)
Culladia yomii Schouten, 1993
Culladia zhengi Li & Li, 2011

References
Bleszynski, 1970. A revision of the genus Culladia Moore (Studies on the Crambinae, Lepidoptera, Pyralidae, Part 50) Tijdschrift voor entomologie 113: 44-59
Li, W.C. & Li, H.H., 2011. The genus Culladia Moore (Lepidoptera, Crambidae, Crambinae) from China, with descriptions of one new species and one newly recorded species. Acta Zootaxonomica Sinica 36 (3): 586-589.

Crambini
Crambidae genera
Taxa named by Frederic Moore